Paraskevas Avgerinos is a Greek politician, who, from 1984 until 1999, was a Member of the European Parliament (MEP), representing Greece for the Panhellenic Socialist Movement.

Parliamentary service
Chair, Delegation for relations with Yugoslavia (1989–1992)
Chair, Delegation for relations with the Republics of Yugoslavia (1992–1993)
Chair, Delegation for relations with the Republics of former Yugoslavia (1993–1994)
Vice-Chair, Delegation for relations with Cyprus (1985–1987)
Vice Chair, Committee on Regional Policy and Regional Planning (1987–1989)

References

1927 births
Living people
People from Arcadia, Peloponnese
PASOK MEPs
MEPs for Greece 1984–1989
MEPs for Greece 1989–1994
MEPs for Greece 1994–1999